The Revista Chilena de Historia Natural is a bilingual open access scientific journal published by the Sociedad de Biología de Chile covering research in many areas of biology. It was established in 1897 by Carlos Porter.

Abstracting and indexing 
The journal is abstracted and indexed in:

References

External links 
 

Open access journals
Biology journals
Multidisciplinary scientific journals
Publications established in 1897
Multilingual journals
1897 establishments in Chile
Academic journals published by non-profit organizations of Chile